Fredericka Berneice "Fritzi" Ridgeway (April 8, 1898 – March 29, 1961) was an American silent film actress, vaudeville performer, and hotelier. Though she starred in numerous films, she is perhaps best known for her work in silent Western films.

A native of Montana, Ridgeway worked as both a vaudeville performer and a professional trick rider before making her film debut in 1916. She appeared in 63 films between 1916 and 1934, with prominent roles in Western films populating much of her early career. Other notable roles include supporting parts in Tod Browning's drama The Unpainted Woman (1919) and The Enemy (1927).

Ridgeway officially retired from acting in 1934, making her final screen appearance in Rouben Mamoulian's We Live Again. She spent the latter half of her life managing the Hotel del Tahquitz in Palm Springs, California, a hotel she built in 1928. She remained the proprietor of the Hotel del Tahquitz until her death in 1961. She was married to Russian composer Constantin Bakaleinikoff. In L.A. Exposed: Strange Myths and Curious Legends in the City of Angels, historian Paul Young noted Ridgeway as an "iconoclastic silent film star."

Early life
Ridgeway was born Frederick Berneice Hawkes on April 8, 1898 in Missoula, Montana, later moving with her family to Butte, Montana, where she attended primary school. Prior to establishing herself as a film actress, Ridgeway worked as both a vaudeville performer and as a trick rider. As a teenager, Ridgeway traveled with her family between Montana and California, and attended Hollywood High School in Los Angeles. She was also educated in Chicago.

Career

Early films
She made her film debut in the short The Bridesmaid's Secret (1916), and appeared the following year in her first feature film role in the Western The Hero of the Hour (1917). Ridgeway would appear in several silent Western shorts after, including The Wrong Man (1917) and The Soul Herder (1917). Her appearances in Westerns earned her the name of the "cowgirl star" early in her career. She appeared as Evelyn Hastings in the 1917 picture The Learnin' of Jim Benton opposite Roy Stewart, and was noted in a review for her "delightful" performance in the film.

In 1919, Ridgeway appeared in Victor Schertzinger's comedy When Doctors Disagree, followed by a supporting part in Tod Browning's drama The Unpainted Woman (1919) for Universal Pictures. She would continue to play in silent pictures into the late 1920s, including roles in the drama The Old Homestead (1922), the Western Ruggles of Red Gap (1923), and the drama The Enemy (1927), opposite Lillian Gish.

Later work and retirement
In 1932, she appeared in Ladies of the Big House, which received positive critical acclaim with a review in The New York Times noting: "the film manages to convey this terror with a fair measure of success." In 1934, she appeared in a supporting part in the horror film House of Mystery (1934) opposite Verna Hillie and John Sheehan. Ridgeway made her final screen appearance in a minor uncredited role in We Live Again (1934), an adaptation of Leo Tolstoy's Resurrection, before retiring from acting.

Ridgefield spent her remaining years managing the Hotel del Tahquitz, a 100-room hotel which she had built in Palm Springs, California in 1928.

Personal life
Ridgeway married Russian composer Constantin Bakaleinikoff in Cincinnati, Ohio on December 23, 1925. In March 1928, Ridgeway commissioned architect Anthony Miller to design a home for her, which was built in Los Angeles, California. She would later marry Walter D. Simm, whom she remained married to until her death of a heart attack in 1961.

She is interred at Forest Lawn Memorial Park, Glendale, California.

Filmography

References

Works cited

Further reading

External links

 
 Fritzi Ridgeway at the American Film Institute Catalog
 Fritzi Ridgeway at the British Film Institute
 
 Fritzi Ridgeway library search at WorldCat

1898 births
1961 deaths
American film actresses
American hoteliers
Women hoteliers
American silent film actresses
Actresses from Butte, Montana
Actresses from Palm Springs, California
Burials at Forest Lawn Memorial Park (Glendale)
Hollywood High School alumni
People from Missoula, Montana
20th-century American actresses
Vaudeville performers